Diogo Junior Pereira (born 27 March 1990) is a Brazilian footballer. He last played for Vietnamese club Than Quảng Ninh as a forward.

Club career
Born in São Paulo, Pereira represented the under-17 team of Palmeiras as a youth. He joined Guarani academy in 2010, and made his professional debut with the senior team in the same year. He joined Clube Atlético Bragantino of Campeonato Brasileiro Série B in the following year. However he failed to break to the first team and to get more playing opportunities, he joined Associação Esportiva Santacruzense on loan. In 2012 playing for Santacruzense he impressed Noroeste scoring a brace while playing against.  A few months later, he joined Noroeste on loan for the second half of year, scoring the winner goal on Copa Paulista final.  In the following years, he continued to play for lower division clubs - Marília Atlético Clube, Grêmio Esportivo Novorizontino, Grêmio Barueri, Clube Esportivo Aimoré (loan), Itabaina amongst others.

On 8 June 2017, Pereira moved abroad and signed for Vietnamese club Becamex Binh Duong.
On 2018, Pereira moved abroad and signed for different Vietnamese club SHB Da Nang.

References

External links

1990 births
Living people
Association football forwards
Brazilian footballers
Guarani FC players
Esporte Clube Noroeste players
Marília Atlético Clube players
Grêmio Novorizontino players
Rio Branco Esporte Clube players
J. Malucelli Futebol players
Campeonato Brasileiro Série B players
V.League 1 players
Brazilian expatriate footballers
Footballers from São Paulo